Haemogamasus is a genus of mites in the family Haemogamasidae. In North America, they mostly infect rodents, in addition to other small mammals such as shrews, talpids, and Virginia opossums.

An unidentified immature Haemogamasus has been found on the marsh rice rat (Oryzomys palustris) in Georgia.

Species
 Haemogamasus ambulans
 Haemogamasus angustus Ma, Ye & Zhang, 1996
 Haemogamasus arvicolarum Berlese, 1920
 Haemogamasus bascanus Senotrusova, 1985
 Haemogamasus cucurbitoides Wang & Pan, in Wang, Pan & Yan 1994
 Haemogamasus daliensis Tian, 1990
 Haemogamasus dauricus Bregetova
 Haemogamasus dimini Senotrusova, 1987
 Haemogamasus dorsalis Teng & Pan
 Haemogamasus emeiensis Zhou, 1981
 Haemogamasus ghanii Williams, in Williams, Smiley & Redington 1978
 Haemogamasus gongshanensis Tian & Gu, 1989
 Haemogamasus gui Tian, 1990
 Haemogamasus harperi
 Haemogamasus hirsutus Berlese, 1889
 Haemogamasus horridus Michael, 1892
 Haemogamasus huangzhongensis Yang & Gu, 1986
 Haemogamasus keegani
 Haemogamasus liberensis Domrow, 1960
 Haemogamasus liponyssoides
 Haemogamasus longitarsus
 Haemogamasus macrodentilis Piao & Ma, 1980
 Haemogamasus mandschuricus Vitz.
 Haemogamasus microti Senotrusova, 1985
 Haemogamasus multidentis Guo & Gu, 1997
 Haemogamasus nidi Michael, 1892
 Haemogamasus nidiformis Bregetova, 1956
 Haemogamasus occidentalis
 Haemogamasus onychomydis
 Haemogamasus pingi Chang
 Haemogamasus pontiger (Berlese, 1903)
 Haemogamasus postsinuatus Liu & Ma, 2002
 Haemogamasus qinghaiensis Yang & Gu, 1985
 Haemogamasus reidi
 Haemogamasus sanxiaensis Liu & Ma, in Liu, Hu & Ma 2001
 Haemogamasus serdjukovae Bregetova, 1949
 Haemogamasus sexsetosus Guo & Gu, 1998
 Haemogamasus suncus Allred
 Haemogamasus tangkeensis Zhou, 1981
 Haemogamasus thomomysi Williams, in Williams, Smiley & Redington 1978
 Haemogamasus trapezoideus Teng & Pan, 1964
 Haemogamasus trifurcisetus Zhou & Jiang, 1987
 Haemogamasus yushuensis Sun & Yin, 1995

See also
List of parasites of the marsh rice rat

References

Literature cited
Estébanes-González, M.L. and Cervantes, F.A. 2005. Mites and ticks associated with some small mammals in Mexico (subscription required). International Journal of Acarology 31(1):23–37.
Whitaker, J.O., Walters, B.L., Castor, L.K., Ritzi, C.M. and Wilson, N. 2007. Host and distribution lists of mites (Acari), parasitic and phoretic, in the hair or on the skin of North American wild mammals north of Mexico: records since 1974. Faculty Publications from the Harold W. Manter Laboratory of Parasitology, University of Nebraska, Lincoln 1:1–173.
Wilson, N. and Durden, L.A. 2003. Ectoparasites of terrestrial vertebrates inhabiting the Georgia Barrier Islands, USA: an inventory and preliminary biogeographical analysis (subscription required). Journal of Biogeography 30(8):1207–1220.

Mesostigmata
Arachnids of North America